National Grid or National grid may refer to:

Power transmission
 Electrical grid, an interconnected network for delivering electricity
 National Grid (Great Britain), the electricity transmission network of Great Britain
 National Grid plc, a utilities company based in the UK that also operates in the northeastern United States
 National Grid (India), the electricity transmission network of India
 National Grid (Malaysia), the electricity transmission network of Malaysia
 National Grid (New Zealand), the electricity transmission network of New Zealand

Geosurvey
 National grid reference system, a national geographical coordinate system for mapping
 Ordnance Survey National Grid, used in Great Britain
 Irish national grid reference system
 United States National Grid

Other uses
 National Grid for Learning, a former government funded educational program in the UK

See also
 Power Grid Corporation of India
 State Grid Corporation of China